Hollingdale may refer to:

 Bert Hollingdale (1889–1961), Welsh international rugby union player
 Noel Hollingdale (1911–2000), Australian rugby union player
 Paul Hollingdale (1938–2017), British radio presenter
 Reginald John Hollingdale, English biographer and translator 
 Thomas Hollingdale (1900–1978), Welsh international rugby union player